The Uruguay national beach handball team is the national team of Uruguay. It is governed by the Uruguay Handball Federation and takes part in international beach handball competitions.

Results

World Championship

World Beach Games

Other Competitions
2019 South American Beach Games – 
2019 South and Central American Beach Handball Championship - 
2022 South and Central American Beach Handball Championship -

Youth team results
2022 Youth Beach Handball World Championship - 14th
2022 South and Central American Youth Beach Handball Championship -

References

External links
Official website
IHF profile

Beach handball
National beach handball teams